Filip Fischer (born 8 March 1981) is a Swedish snowboarder. He competed in the men's parallel giant slalom event at the 2006 Winter Olympics.

References

External links
 

1981 births
Living people
Swedish male snowboarders
Olympic snowboarders of Sweden
Snowboarders at the 2006 Winter Olympics
People from Malung-Sälen Municipality
Sportspeople from Dalarna County
21st-century Swedish people